Frederick Hugh Crowley (31 December 1890 – 5 May 1945) was an Irish Fianna Fáil politician who served as a Teachta Dála (TD) from 1927 to 1945.

He was born on 31 December 1890 in the family home at Gurteen, County Cork, son of Michael N. Crowley, manufacturer, and Honor Crowley (née Cronin). He was Educated at the North Monastery School, Cork, and the University of Leeds (1909–12), he graduated with a diploma in textile industry (July 1912) and moved to Rathmore, County Kerry, where his family then resided.

He was an enthusiastic supporter of Conradh na Gaeilge and joined the Irish Volunteers in 1914. He later served with the IRA, taking part in many raids including an attack on Rathmore RIC barracks. A member of Kerry County Council from 1917, he took the anti-treaty side in the Irish Civil War and joined Fianna Fáil at its foundation.

A lecturer and farmer, he was first elected to Dáil Éireann as a Fianna Fáil TD for the Kerry constituency at the September 1927 general election. He was re-elected to the Dáil at the next seven general elections, switching to the new Kerry South constituency at the 1937 general election. He died in 1945 while still in office.

After his death, the by-election in Kerry South on 4 December 1945 was won for Fianna Fáil by his widow, Honor Crowley. It was the first case anywhere in Ireland of a woman succeeding her husband at a by-election. Honor Crowley, a daughter of the MP John Pius Boland, remained a TD until her death in 1966.

References

1890 births
1945 deaths
Fianna Fáil TDs
Irish farmers
Members of the 6th Dáil
Members of the 7th Dáil
Members of the 8th Dáil
Members of the 9th Dáil
Members of the 10th Dáil
Members of the 11th Dáil
Members of the 12th Dáil
Spouses of Irish politicians
Alumni of the University of Leeds